William Alan Friedle (born August 11, 1976) is an American actor and writer. He is best known for his role as Eric Matthews on the ABC sitcom Boy Meets World (1993–2000). In animation, he provides the voices of Terry McGinnis / Batman on Batman Beyond (1999–2001), Ron Stoppable on Kim Possible (2002–07), Doyle Blackwell on The Secret Saturdays (2008), Jaime Reyes / Blue Beetle on Batman: The Brave and the Bold (2008–11), Lion-O on the 2011 reboot of ThunderCats (2011–12), Bumblebee in the Transformers franchise (2013–16) and Star-Lord on Guardians of the Galaxy (2015–19) and Kashaw Vesh in The Legend of Vox Machina (2022).

Early life
Friedle was born in Hartford, Connecticut, the youngest of three boys of Patricia Joan (née Leary) and Gary Allen Friedle, both lawyers. His older brothers are Gary and Greg Friedle. After committing himself to becoming an actor, Friedle continually commuted from Avon, Connecticut, to New York City for auditions. He graduated from Avon High School in 1994.

Friedle is allegedly credited on school brochures as having attended Occidental College. However, when interviewed on the February 11, 2019, episode of Critical Role: Between The Sheets, he admitted having never attended the school. He stated that he learned he was being inaccurately credited by Occidental College as being an alumnus when his nephew visited the school and showed him the information package. Occidental College is not able to confirm that Friedle was ever used on marketing brochures; however, co-star Rider Strong attended Occidental College briefly during the filming of Boy Meets World. Additionally, he stated that he studied Latin for six years because he intended to become an archaeologist eventually. In the July 4, 2006, issue of People, Friedle mentioned he had thought about attending culinary school.

Career

After co-hosting Nickelodeon's Don't Just Sit There for three seasons (1988–1991), Friedle was cast as Cory Matthews' likeable but underachieving elder brother Eric on the long-running TV sitcom Boy Meets World from 1993 to 2000. In 1998, he starred with Elizabeth Harnois, Dabney Coleman & Jay Thomas in My Date with the President's Daughter as part of The Wonderful World of Disney.

In 2004, he co-starred with Chris Owen in the independent film National Lampoon's Gold Diggers (originally titled Lady Killers). He also appeared in a supporting role in the 2005 ABC Family movie Everything You Want. Friedle was cast as Mike in the WB sitcom Off Centre, but could not accept the role because of a previous commitment to the UPN series The Random Years. The role ended up going to Eddie Kaye Thomas.

Friedle voiced Seifer Almasy in the English version of the video game Kingdom Hearts II, Gideon Wyeth in the English version of the video game Advent Rising, and Jaster Rogue in the English version of the video game Rogue Galaxy.

In December 2013, in spite of initial reluctance, it was announced that Friedle would reprise his Boy Meets World role of Eric Matthews on the continuation series Girl Meets World.

In April 2014, it was confirmed that Friedle reprised his Batman Beyond role of Terry McGinnis on the Batman Beyond short made by Darwyn Cooke to commemorate the 75th Anniversary of Batman.

On June 27, 2019, the premiere episode of Christy's Kitchen Throwback featuring Friedle was uploaded to Christy Carlson Romano's YouTube Channel.

Beginning March 4, 2022, Friedle and Romano began co-hosting a podcast called I Hear Voices available on Romano's YouTube channel and other podcast providers. Among the notable guests have included Eric Bauza, Shelby Young, Kevin Conroy, E.G. Daily, Phil LaMarr, Andrea Romano, Jason Marsden (who is also Friedle's real life best friend), Dan Povenmire, and Tara Strong. On June 7, 2022, the 20th anniversary of Kim Possible, the podcast had a special episode with creators Mark McCorkle and Bob Schooley and voice actors John DiMaggio (Drakken) and Nicole Sullivan (Shego), as well as a brand new Kim Possible scene with the four actors written by McCorkle and Schooley and directed by original voice director Lisa Schaffer.

On June 15, 2022, Friedle voiced the character Radiant Black in a promotional short for the comic's fifteenth issue. The short can be viewed on the official Black Market Narrative YouTube channel.

He has hosted the Boy Meets World rewatch podcast Pod Meets World with Danielle Fishel and Rider Strong since 2022.

Personal life
In 1997, Friedle dated actress Jennifer Love Hewitt, and co-starred with her in the romantic teen comedy Trojan War. Hewitt made a guest appearance as Jennifer Love "Feffy" Fefferman on Boy Meets World episode "And Then There Was Shawn".

Friedle is best friends with actor Jason Marsden and was the best man at Marsden's wedding in October 2004. The two have also worked together in numerous productions: Boy Meets World (until Marsden's departure from the series in season 3 and his character Jason Marsden was eventually replaced by Matthew Lawrence's character Jack Hunter starting in season 5), Trojan War, Static Shock, Kim Possible, Batman Beyond, Justice League Unlimited, Batman: The Brave and the Bold, ThunderCats, Transformers: Rescue Bots and Mad.

He married his girlfriend, Susan Martens, on September 25, 2016, in Connecticut. His affectionate name for her is Mrs. Squirrels in reference to his nickname "Plays With Squirrels" that as Eric he acquired in the final season of Boy Meets World.

Filmography

Film

Television

Video games

Web series

References

External links

Will Friedle on the Super Hero Speak podcast from NYCC 2019

Living people
American male child actors
American male comedians
American male film actors
American male television actors
American male video game actors
American male voice actors
Comedians from Connecticut
Occidental College alumni
Male actors from Hartford, Connecticut
Writers from Hartford, Connecticut
20th-century American male actors
21st-century American comedians
21st-century American male actors
1976 births